Charles Cahill Wilson (July 29, 1894 – January 7, 1948) was an American screen and stage actor. He appeared in numerous films during the Golden Age of Hollywood from the late 1920s to late 1940s.

Biography
Born in New York City in 1894, the white-haired, burly actor was often typecast as an earnest police officer, newspaper editor or principal. He appeared in over 250 films between 1928 and 1948, mostly playing small supporting roles with a few sentences. Charles Wilson began his acting career at the theatre, including roles in six Broadway plays between 1918 and 1931. In 1928, he directed the Hollywood comedy Lucky Boy (1928), where he also made his film debut. According to the Internet Movie Database, Lucky Boy was Wilson's only film as a director.

His most notable role was probably Clark Gable's "wonderfully aggravated" newspaper boss in Frank Capra's comedy It Happened One Night, which won five Academy Awards in 1935. He was also cast in small roles in other Capra movies such as Mr. Deeds Goes to Town (1936) and It's a Wonderful Life (1946). 

Wilson freelanced at various studios throughout his career, but he is perhaps best known for his work at Columbia Pictures. In addition to his films for Frank Capra, Wilson also appeared prominently in Columbia serials including The Spider's Web (1938), Batman (1943), and The Secret Code (1943), as well as in Columbia comedy shorts with Harry Von Zell, Hugh Herbert, and The Three Stooges. He played one leading role in what turned to be his last film, Blazing Across the Pecos (1948), as the villain opposite cowboy hero Charles Starrett. 

Wilson died at the age of 53 of esophageal varices.

Selected filmography

 Lucky Boy (1928, also director) - Bit Part (uncredited)
 Acquitted (1929) - Detective Nelson
 Broadway Scandals (1929) - Jack
 Song of Love (1929) - Traveling Salesman
 Stolen Heaven (1931) - Detective (uncredited)
 Secrets of a Secretary (1931) - Police Captain (uncredited)
 My Sin (1931) - Guest in Pool Party (uncredited)
 Hard to Handle (1933) - Jailer (uncredited)
 Infernal Machine (1933) - First Mate (uncredited)
 Elmer, the Great (1933) - Mr. Wade
 Gold Diggers of 1933 (1933) - Deputy (uncredited)
 Private Detective 62 (1933) - Bartender (uncredited)
 Heroes for Sale (1933) - 'Red' Squad Policeman #2 (uncredited)
 The Mayor of Hell (1933) - Wilson (uncredited)
 Disgraced! (1933) - Thompson, Assistant District Attorney (uncredited)
 Mary Stevens, M.D. (1933) - Walter Rising
 No Marriage Ties (1933) - Red Moran, City Desk Editor
 Footlight Parade (1933) - Policeman (uncredited)
 The Kennel Murder Case (1933) - Det. Hennessy (uncredited)
 College Coach (1933) - Charles Hauser
 Female (1933) - Private Detective Falihee (uncredited)
 Havana Widows (1933) - Mr. Timberg
 Dancing Lady (1933) - Club Manager (uncredited)
 Roman Scandals (1933) - Police Chief Charles Pratt (uncredited)
 Shadows of Sing Sing (1933)
 Miss Fane's Baby Is Stolen (1934) - Chief of Police (uncredited)
 Cross Country Cruise (1934) - Detective (uncredited)
 The Ninth Guest (1934) - Burke (uncredited)
 I've Got Your Number (1934) - Detective Welch (uncredited)
 It Happened One Night (1934) - Joe Gordon
 The Crosby Case (1934) - Detective Summers (uncredited)
 Gambling Lady (1934) - Detective Making Raid (uncredited)
 Harold Teen (1934) - 'Mac' McKinsey
 I Believed in You (1934) - Magistrate (uncredited)
 Affairs of a Gentleman (1934) - Inspector Quillan
 Fog Over Frisco (1934) - Detective Sgt. O'Hagen
 The Hell Cat (1934) - Graham
 The Circus Clown (1934) - Sheldon
 Name the Woman (1934) - Joel Walker
 Beyond the Law (1934) - Prosecuting Attorney
 The Girl from Missouri (1934) - Police Lt. O'Sullivan (uncredited)
 The Dragon Murder Case (1934) - Det. Hennessey
 The Human Side (1934) - Furniture Buyer (uncredited)
 Embarrassing Moments (1934) - Attorney
 The Lemon Drop Kid (1934) - Warden
 The St. Louis Kid (1934) - Mr. Harris - the Trucking Company Boss
 Men of the Night (1934) - Benson
 Broadway Bill (1934) - Collins
 Behold My Wife! (1934) - Police Captain (uncredited)
 Murder in the Clouds (1934) - Lackey
 Here Is My Heart (1934) - Captain Dodge (uncredited)
 The Secret Bride (1934) - Lt. Forrest (uncredited)
 White Lies (1934) - Defense Attorney (uncredited)
 The Gilded Lily (1935) - Managing Editor
 The Little Colonel (1935) - Jeremy Higgins (uncredited)
 Car 99 (1935) - Trooper Captain Ryan
 The Great Hotel Murder (1935) - Anthony Wilson
 The Perfect Clue (1935) - District Attorney
 Princess O'Hara (1935) - Newcomb (uncredited)
 Four Hours to Kill! (1935) - Taft
 Baby Face Harrington (1935) - City Editor (uncredited)
 The Case of the Curious Bride (1935) - Ferry Captain (uncredited)
 Reckless (1935) - Newspaper Editor (uncredited)
 Men of the Hour (1935) - Harper
 Air Hawks (1935) - Tribune Editor (uncredited)
 Murder in the Fleet (1935) - Cmdr. Brown (uncredited)
 The Nitwits (1935) - Police Captain Jennings
 The Glass Key (1935) - District Attorney Edward J. Farr
 Smart Girl (1935) - Morgan (uncredited)
 After the Dance (1935) - Chief of Police (uncredited)
 Dante's Inferno (1935) - Police Inspector (uncredited)
 The Public Menace (1935) - First Detective
 Waterfront Lady (1935) - Jim McFee aka Mac
 The Case of the Lucky Legs (1935) - Police Officer Ricker
 This Is the Life (1935) - Theater Manager (uncredited)
 Rendezvous (1935) - Editor (uncredited)
 Fighting Youth (1935) - Bull Stevens
 Music Is Magic (1935) - Decker - Theatre Manager (uncredited)
 Mary Burns, Fugitive (1935) - G-Man at dancehall
 Thanks a Million (1935) - Motor Policeman Sergeant (uncredited)
 Another Face (1935) - Police Captain Spellman (uncredited)
 Show Them No Mercy! (1935) - Clifford
 We're Only Human (1935) - Star City Editor Morgan (uncredited)
 Hitch Hike Lady (1935) - Mike - a Racketeer
 Strike Me Pink (1936) - Hardie
 The Return of Jimmy Valentine (1936) - Kelley
 The Country Doctor (1936) - George - Boat Captain (uncredited)
 Big Brown Eyes (1936) - Prosecuting Attorney (uncredited)
 Mr. Deeds Goes to Town (1936) - County Hospital Guard (uncredited)
 Panic on the Air (1936) - Chief Insp. Fitzgerald
 Small Town Girl (1936) - Mr. Donaldson (uncredited)
 The Mine with the Iron Door (1936) - Pitkins
 Show Boat (1936) - Jim Green (uncredited)
 Ticket to Paradise (1936) - Detective (uncredited)
 Satan Met a Lady (1936) - Detective Pollock
 Earthworm Tractors (1936) - H.J. Russell
 36 Hours to Kill (1936) - FBI Chief (uncredited)
 Grand Jury (1936) - Clark, Chronicle City Editor
 I'd Give My Life (1936) - Warden
 The Gentleman from Louisiana (1936) - Diamond Jim Brady
 Down the Stretch (1936) - Tex Reardon
 Three Married Men (1936) - Train Conductor
 Murder with Pictures (1936) - Assistant Editor (uncredited)
 The Magnificent Brute (1936) - Murphy
 Pigskin Parade (1936) - Yale Coach (uncredited)
 Rose Bowl (1936) - Burke (uncredited)
 Legion of Terror (1936) - Colonel McCollum
 Pennies from Heaven (1936) - Prison Warden (uncredited)
 White Hunter (1936) - Minor Role (uncredited)
 Mind Your Own Business (1936) - Detective
 Find the Witness (1937) - Charley Blair (uncredited)
 Woman in Distress (1937) - Herbert Glaxton
 Woman-Wise (1937) - Commissioner (uncredited)
 You Only Live Once (1937) - Police Inspector (uncredited)
 Girl Overboard (1937) - Editor (uncredited)
 They Wanted to Marry (1937) - Clark
 The Great O'Malley (1937) - Policeman Chiding School Bus Driver (uncredited)
 Murder Goes to College (1937) - Inspector Simpson
 Midnight Court (1937) - Police Chief (uncredited)
 Night Key (1937) - Police Capt. Wallace (uncredited)
 The Case of the Stuttering Bishop (1937) - Hamilton Burger
 The Devil Is Driving (1937) - Defense Attorney Dan Healy (uncredited)
 Roaring Timber (1937) - Sam Garvin
 One Mile from Heaven (1937) - Fletcher (uncredited)
 Broadway Melody of 1938 (1937) - Horse Auctioneer (uncredited)
 Life Begins in College (1937) - Coach Burke
 Partners in Crime (1937) - Inspector Simpson
 That's My Story (1937) - Cummings
 The Adventurous Blonde (1937) - Mortimer Gray
 Thoroughbreds Don't Cry (1937) - Horse Owner (uncredited)
 Daughter of Shanghai (1937) - Schwartz (uncredited)
 Sally, Irene and Mary (1938) - Covered Wagon Cafe Manager
 State Police (1938) - Capt. Halstead
 Little Miss Thoroughbred (1938) - Mr. Becker, the Gambler
 Prison Farm (1938) - Reardon (uncredited)
 When Were You Born (1938) - Inspector Jim C. Gregg (Taurus)
 Gateway (1938) - Inspector (uncredited)
 The Gladiator (1938) - Theatre Manager (uncredited)
 Tenth Avenue Kid (1938) - Commissioner
 Hold That Co-ed (1938) - Coach Burke
 The Night Hawk (1938) - Lonigan
 The Spider's Web (1938) - Chase
 Five of a Kind (1938) -  Editor Crocker (uncredited)
 Angels with Dirty Faces (1938) - Police Lt. Buckley (uncredited)
 Little Orphan Annie (1938) - Val Lewis
 There's That Woman Again (1938) - Police Captain (uncredited)
 Fighting Thoroughbreds (1939) - Spencer Bogart
 Pardon Our Nerve (1939) - Boxing Commissioner (uncredited)
 I Was a Convict (1939) - Peterson (uncredited)
 The Lady's from Kentucky (1939) - Steward (uncredited)
 Rose of Washington Square (1939) - Police Lt. Mike Cavanaugh
 The House of Fear (1939) - Police Chief (uncredited)
 The Forgotten Woman (1939) - Gray (uncredited)
 The Cowboy Quarterback (1939) - Coach Hap Farrell
 Hotel for Women (1939) - Albert (uncredited)
 Here I Am a Stranger (1939) - Managing Editor
 Smashing the Money Ring (1939) - Capt. Kilrane
 The Roaring Twenties (1939) - Policeman (uncredited)
 The Return of Doctor X (1939) - Detective Roy Kincaid
 Invisible Stripes (1939) - Arresting Officer (uncredited)
 He Married His Wife (1940) - Warden
 Enemy Agent (1940) - Chief (uncredited)
 Gangs of Chicago (1940) - C.A. Graham - Chief of Police (uncredited)
 Sandy Is a Lady (1940) - Sergeant
 Girl in 313 (1940) - Vincent Brady, Commissioner of Police
 Millionaires in Prison (1940) - R.J. Reynolds, Sunday Editor (uncredited)
 They Drive by Night (1940) - Mike Williams (uncredited)
 Public Deb No. 1 (1940) - Sergeant (uncredited)
 City for Conquest (1940) - Bill - Man Behind MacPherson at Fight (uncredited)
 So You Won't Talk (1940) - Johnson (uncredited)
 Knute Rockne, All American (1940) - Gambler (uncredited)
 South of Suez (1940) - Guard (scenes deleted)
 Tin Pan Alley (1940) - Police Desk Sergeant (uncredited)
 Lady with Red Hair (1940) - George Martin (uncredited)
 Charter Pilot (1940) - Owen
 The Face Behind the Mask (1941) - Chief O'Brien
 Tall, Dark and Handsome (1941) - Charles, Assistant District Attorney (uncredited)
 Ride, Kelly, Ride (1941) - Racing Secretary (uncredited)
 Meet John Doe (1941) - Charlie Dawson
 Two Señoritas from Chicago (1943)
 Las Vegas Nights (1946) - Ed - Deputy Sheriff (uncredited)
 Knockout (1941) - Monigan
 Federal Fugitives (1941) - Bruce Lane
 Strange Alibi (1941) - Police Desk Sergeant (uncredited)
 Broadway Limited (1941) - Detective
 Out of the Fog (1941) - Police Inspector (uncredited)
 Two in a Taxi (1941) - Captain Melton (uncredited)
 Dressed to Kill (1941) - Editor
 The Officer and the Lady (1941) - Police Captain Hart
 Blues in the Night (1941) - Barney
 All Through the Night (1942) - Police Lieutenant at Miller's Home Bakery (uncredited)
 Blondie Goes to College (1942) - Police Sergeant (uncredited)
 The Man Who Returned to Life (1942) - Inspector Mensil (uncredited)
 Rings on Her Fingers (1942) - Captain Hurley
 Lady Gangster (1942) - Detective
 Dr. Broadway (1942) - District Attorney McNamara
 This Gun for Hire (1942) - Police Captain
 Escape from Crime (1942) - Reardon
 The Secret Code (1942, Serial) - Desk Sgt. Cullen
 My Heart Belongs to Daddy (1942) - Desk Sgt. Cullen
 Gentleman Jim (1942) - Gurney (uncredited)
 Two Señoritas from Chicago (1943) - Chester T. Allgood
 Batman (1943, Serial) - Police Capt. Arnold (uncredited)
 Silver Spurs (1943) - Mr. Hawkins
 A Scream in the Dark (1943) - City Editor (uncredited)
 Is Everybody Happy? (1943) - J. Lionel Smaltz (uncredited)
 Shine On, Harvest Moon (1944) - Stage Manager (uncredited)
 Hey, Rookie (1944) - Sam Jonas
 Roger Touhy, Gangster (1944) - Police Capt. After Hay Wagon Crash (uncredited)
 Silent Partner (1944) - North Hollywood Cop (uncredited)
 Man from Frisco (1944) - Key Man (uncredited)
 Shadows in the Night (1944) - Sheriff (uncredited)
 Kansas City Kitty (1944) - Mr. Hugo (uncredited)
 Crime by Night (1944) - District Attorney Hyatt
 The Big Noise (1944) - Train Conductor (uncredited)
 My Buddy (1944) - Chief Detective
 Irish Eyes Are Smiling (1944) - Detective (uncredited)
 The Missing Juror (1944) - Mac Ellis--Newspaper Editor (uncredited)
 Eadie Was a Lady (1945) - Berger (uncredited)
 Brewster's Millions (1945) - Charlie - the Stage Director (uncredited)
 Two O'Clock Courage (1945) - Brant - City Editor (uncredited)
 The Chicago Kid (1945) - Butler (uncredited)
 Incendiary Blonde (1945) - Mr. Ballinger (uncredited)
 Week-End at the Waldorf (1945) - Hi Johns
 Road to Utopia (1945) - Official Policeman (uncredited)
 Scarlet Street (1945) - Watchman (uncredited)
 Because of Him (1946) - City Editor (uncredited)
 Crime of the Century (1946) - Police Lieutenant
 I Ring Doorbells (1946) - The Inspector
 The Phantom Thief (1946) - Police Lieutenant (uncredited)
 Passkey to Danger (1946) - Police Sergeant
 Larceny in Her Heart (1946) - Chief Gentry
 Blonde for a Day (1946) - Chief of Police Will Gentry
 Suspense (1946) - Police Officer (uncredited)
 Dangerous Business (1946) - Police Sergeant (uncredited)
 If I'm Lucky (1946) - Police Chief (uncredited)
 Gas House Kids (1946) - Inspector Shannon
 Ginger (1946) - Police Sergeant (uncredited)
 Bringing Up Father (1946) - Frank - the Hotel Doorman
 It's a Wonderful Life (1946) - Charlie (uncredited)
 The Secret Life of Walter Mitty (1947) - Police Desk Sergeant (uncredited)
 Key Witness (1947) - Warden (uncredited)
 Her Husband's Affairs (1947) - Police Captain (uncredited)
 Crime on Their Hands (1948, Short) - J.L. Cameron - Managing Editor
 Big Town Scandal (1948) - Editor of the Chronicle (uncredited)
 Blazing Across the Pecos (1948) - Mayor Ace Brockway
 Commotion on the Ocean (1956, Short) - J.L. Cameron - Managing Editor (archive footage)

References

External links

 

1894 births
1948 deaths
American male film actors
American male stage actors
20th-century American male actors
Male actors from New York City